Lithuania competed at the 1992 Summer Olympics in Barcelona, Spain. It was the first Olympiad after the breakup of the Soviet Union.  Lithuania was one of three ex-Soviet republics to compete individually, with Estonia and Latvia being the other two, instead of competing on the Unified Team. 47 competitors, 36 men and 11 women, took part in 31 events in 11 sports.

Medalists

Competitors
The following is the list of number of competitors in the Games.

Athletics

Men
Track & road events

Field events

Women
Field events

Combined events – Heptathlon

Basketball

Men's Team Competition

Preliminary round

Group B

Quarterfinals

Semifinals

Bronze medal game

Team roster
 Romanas Brazdauskis
 Valdemaras Chomičius
 Darius Dimavičius
 Gintaras Einikis
 Sergejus Jovaiša
 Artūras Karnišovas
 Gintaras Krapikas
 Rimas Kurtinaitis
 Šarūnas Marčiulionis
 Alvydas Pazdrazdis
 Arvydas Sabonis
 Arūnas Visockas

Boxing

Men

Canoeing

Men

Cycling

Five cyclists, one man and four women, represented Lithuania in 1992.

Road

Track
Sprint

Pursuit

Judo

Men

Modern pentathlon

Three male pentathletes represented Lithuania in 1992.

Rowing

Men

Women

Sailing

Men

Swimming

Men

Wrestling

Men's Greco-Roman

References

External links
International Olympic Committee results database

Nations at the 1992 Summer Olympics
1992
1992 in Lithuanian sport